The Women's 7.5 kilometre sprint biathlon competition at the 1998 Winter Olympics was held on 15 February, at Nozawa Onsen. Competitors raced over two 2.5 kilometre loops and one 3.0 kilometre loop of the skiing course, shooting two times, once prone and once standing. Each miss was penalized by requiring the competitor to race over a 150-metre penalty loop.

Results

References

Sports-Reference.com - Women's 7.5 km Sprint - 1998 Olympics

Women's biathlon at the 1998 Winter Olympics
Biath
Women's events at the 1998 Winter Olympics